Luis Daniel Hernández Alfaro (born 20 December 1977) is a Peruvian footballer. He currently plays for Inti Gas Deportes, as a left back.

Club career 
Hernández used to play for Universitario de Deportes, Sporting Cristal and Unión Huaral.

International career
Hernández has made six appearances for the Peru national football team.

Honours

Club
 Unión Huaral:
 Peruvian Second Division: 2002

References

External links
Luis Daniel Hernández at footballdatabase.eu

1977 births
Living people
People from Lima
Peruvian footballers
Peru international footballers
Unión Huaral footballers
Club Universitario de Deportes footballers
Sporting Cristal footballers
Juan Aurich footballers
Colegio Nacional Iquitos footballers
Sport Huancayo footballers
Ayacucho FC footballers
Peruvian Segunda División players
Peruvian Primera División players
Association football fullbacks